Qatar Motor Show is an annual international motor show held in Doha, Qatar. It is held each January at the Doha Exhibitions Centre. The debut motor show was in 2011 which had 90,000 attendees. The 2012 show grew to 120,000 visitors from around the Persian Gulf region.  It features new models as well as supercars, concept cars, custom cars from style centers and automotive designers. Outdoor demonstrations of motocross and drifting are featured as well as test driving.

2013

Dates: 29 January - 2 February. Six new brands join the show in 2013. Bertone to celebrate 100 year anniversary at QMS. W Motors to unveil first Arab-designed hypercar

 Audi R8 V10 Plus
 Brabus Widestar 800
 W Motors LykanHypersport

2012

 Bugatti Veyron Grand Sport Roadster "Middle East Edition" 
 Ford Focus (facelift)
 I.DE.A Futura
 UP Design Vittoria Concept

2011

 Autostudi C-Sport Qatar Concept
 Lamborghini Gallardo LP 560-4 Bicolore
 Lexus LX570 Invader L60
 Porsche Panamera Exclusive Middle East Edition 
 Volkswagen XL1 Concept 
 Volkswagen Race Touareg 3 Qatar Concept
 Volkswagen Touareg V8 TDI Gold Edition Concept

References

External links 
 Official website
 Qatar Motor Show Facebook page
 Qatar Motor Show on Twitter
 Qatar Motor Show YouTube Channel

Auto shows
Events in Doha
Annual events in Qatar
Winter events in Qatar